Gopal Gupta may refer to:
Gopal Gupta (computer scientist), Indian computer scientist
Gopal Gupta (philosopher), Indian philosopher